Sir Edwin Porter Arrowsmith   (23 May 1909 – 10 July 1992) was a British colonial administrator. He was Governor of the Falkland Islands from 1956 to 1964 and concurrently high Commissioner for the British Antarctic Territory from 1962 to 1964.

References

1909 births
1992 deaths
Governors of the Falkland Islands
Knights Commander of the Order of St Michael and St George
People educated at Cheltenham College
Alumni of Trinity College, Oxford